Alkalilimnicola is a genus in the phylum Pseudomonadota (Bacteria).

Etymology
The name Alkalilimnicola derives from alkali (from Arabic al-qalyi, the ashes of saltwort), soda ash; limnos, Greek, pool of standing water, lake; cola (from Latin incola) a dweller, inhabitant, to give Alcalilimnicola, a dweller of alkaline lakes.

Species
The genus contains:
 A. ehrlichii Hoeft et al. 2007 (Latin ehrlichii, of Ehrlich, named in honour of Professor Emeritus Henry Lutz Ehrlich for his broad scientific, teaching, and leadership contributions to the field of geomicrobiology, with specific reference to his work on the bacterial oxidation of arsenite) Among its other traits, A. erhlichii oxidizes carbon monoxide at ambient and subambient levels.
 A. halodurans Yakimov et al. 2001,  (type species of the genus),  Greek hals, halos (ἅλς, ἁλός),salt; Latin durans, enduring, to give halodurans, salt-enduring

See also
 Bacterial taxonomy
 Microbiology

References 

Bacteria genera
Chromatiales